Old Dad is a 1920 American drama film directed by Lloyd Ingraham and written by J. Grubb Alexander. It is based on the 1919 novel Old Dad by Eleanor Hallowell Abbott. The film stars Mildred Harris, John St. Polis, Myrtle Stedman, Irving Cummings, Hazel Howell, and Loyola O'Connor. The film was released in November 1920, by Associated First National Pictures.

Cast       
Mildred Harris as Daphne Bretton
John St. Polis as Jeffrey Bretton 
Myrtle Stedman as Virginia Bretton
Irving Cummings as Sheridan Kaire
Hazel Howell as Peggy Laine
Loyola O'Connor as Claudia Merriwane
Bess Mitchell as Bess Pomeroy
Tula Belle as Little Girl with Two Mothers

References

External links

1920 films
1920s English-language films
Silent American drama films
1920 drama films
Films based on American novels
First National Pictures films
Films directed by Lloyd Ingraham
American silent feature films
American black-and-white films
1920s American films